The Battle of Idano (井田野合戦) was a battle during the Sengoku period (16th century) of Japan. 
The battle took place seven days after the murder of Matsudaira leader Kiyoyasu (grandfather of Tokugawa Ieyasu) at the hands of his vassal Abe Masatoyo.

The forces of Matsudaira set out to take revenge against the rebel Masatoyo and his army, and were victorious.

References

1536 in Japan
Idano
Idano
Idano